Fourth From the Last is the first album by the band The W's, released in 1998 by 5 Minute Walk. The name of the album is derived from the fact that the letter W is the fourth from the last letter in the Latin alphabet.

The album was well received, achieving No. 4 on Billboards Heatseekers chart and "Top Contemporary Christian" charts, and No. 147 on the Billboard 200. Although the album was pulled from the shelves of LifeWay Christian Resources stores for containing "indecent" words the album eventually sold over 200,000 units. The album received two Dove Awards in 1999, first for "Modern Rock Album of the Year," and "Modern Rock Record Song of the Year" for the song "The Devil Is Bad".

The hidden track is a tribute to the band Five Iron Frenzy, performed in the style of Wesley Willis.

Track listing

All songs written by The W's except where noted.

 "Open Minded"
 "The Devil Is Bad"
 "Frank" 
 "J.P."
 "Moses"
 "Pup"
 "King of Polyester"
 "Jason E"
 "Alarm Clock"
 "Flower Tattoo" 
 "Dexter" 
 "Hui"
 Hidden Track (about Five Iron Frenzy)

Credits 
 Andrew Schar — lead vocals, guitar
 Brian Morris — drums, cover art talent
 Valentine Hellman — tenor sax, clarinet
 Bret Barker — trumpet
 Todd Gruener — bass, vocals
 James Carter — alto sax, background vocals

Production
 Masaki Liu – producer
 Frank Tate – executive producer
 Ken Lee – mastering at Kenneth Lee Mastering, Oakland, California
 Aaron James – album design and layout
 David Dobson – photography

References

1998 debut albums
The W's albums